In enzymology, a ferredoxin—nitrite reductase is an enzyme that catalyzes the chemical reaction

NH3 + 2 H2O + 6 oxidized ferredoxin  nitrite + 6 reduced ferredoxin + 7 H+

The 3 substrates of this enzyme are NH3, H2O, and oxidized ferredoxin, whereas its 3 products are nitrite, reduced ferredoxin, and H+.

This enzyme belongs to the family of oxidoreductases, specifically those acting on other nitrogenous compounds as donors with an iron-sulfur protein as acceptor.  The systematic name of this enzyme class is ammonia:ferredoxin oxidoreductase. This enzyme participates in nitrogen metabolism and nitrogen assimilation.  It has 3 cofactors: iron, Siroheme,  and Iron-sulfur.

This enzyme can use many different isoforms of ferredoxin. In photosynthesizing tissues, it uses ferredoxin that is reduced by PSI and in the root it uses a form of ferredoxin (FdIII) that has a less negative midpoint potential and can be reduced easily by NADPH.

Structural studies

References

Literature 

 
 
 

EC 1.7.7
Iron enzymes
Siroheme enzymes
Iron-sulfur enzymes
Enzymes of known structure